Neope yama, the dusky labyrinth, is a species of satyrine butterfly found in Asia. In the Himalayas it is common from the eastern Himalayas to eastern Nepal and less common from western Nepal to Himachal Pradesh.

Description 
Size 70 to 95 mm.

Habits 
Mostly a forest species. A fast flier but often stops on moist spots, carnivore scat and rests on tree trunks and rock surfaces.

Status 
Not a common butterfly and is classified as a Schedule II protected species as per the Indian Wildlife (Protection) Act, 1972

Subspecies
 Neope yama yama – north-western India to Assam, Burma, Thailand
 Neope yama yamoides (Moore, 1892)
 Neope yama kinpingensis ( Lee, 1962) – Laos, northern Vietnam, southern China

References

External links
 
 

Elymniini
Butterflies of Indochina
Butterflies described in 1858